The 2012 Plymouth City Council election took place on 3 May 2012 to elect members of Plymouth City Council in England. This was on the same day as other local elections. The election was won by the Labour Party, who gained control of the council from the Conservative Party.

Background

Plymouth City Council held local elections on 7 May 2012 as part of the 2012 local elections. The council elects its councillors in thirds, with a third being up for election every year for three years, with no election in the fourth year. Councillors defending their seats in this election were previously elected in 2008. In that election, fourteen Conservative candidates and five Labour candidates were elected.

Ahead of the election, the council was split between the Labour Party and the Conservative Party, with the Conservatives having held a majority for five years.

Overall results

|-
| colspan=2 style="text-align: right; margin-right: 1em" | Total
| style="text-align: right;" | 19
| colspan=5 |
| style="text-align: right;" | 57,936
| style="text-align: right;" | 

Note: All changes in vote share are in comparison to the corresponding 2008 election.

The Conservatives lost their overall majority on the council to the Labour Party.

After the previous election, the composition of the council was:

Before this election, the composition of the council was:

After this election, the composition of the council was:

Ward results
Plymouth City Council maintains records of past election results.

Budshead

Compton

Devonport

Efford and Lipson

Eggbuckland

Ham

Honicknowle

Moor View

Peverell

Plympton Chaddlewood

Plympton Erle

Plympton St Mary

Plymstock Dunstone

Plymstock Radford

Southway

Note: Peter Berrow won this seat for the Conservative Party the previous time it was contested in 2008, but defected to UKIP in January 2012.

St Budeaux

Stoke

St Peter and the Waterfront

Sutton and Mount Gould

Aftermath 
Following the election, the Labour Party had an overall majority on the council, meaning their group leader Tudor Evans returned as council leader. Labour's newly elected councillor in Devonport, Kate Taylor, was one of the youngest councillors in the country at eighteen years old. The UK Independence Party lost its only seat on the council.

References

2012 English local elections
2012
2010s in Devon